Menica Rondelly (6 January 1854, Nice, Kingdom of Sardinia – 26 June 1935, Nice) was an Occitan poet.

1854 births
1935 deaths
Occitan poets
People from Nice
French male poets